Gerung is a town on the island of Lombok and is also the capital of the West Lombok Regency in the Indonesian province West Nusa Tenggara.

Climate
Gerung has a tropical monsoon climate (Am) with moderate to little rainfall from May to October and heavy rainfall from November to April.

References

Populated places in Lombok
Regency seats of West Nusa Tenggara